Kristen Marie Hamilton (born April 17, 1992) is an American professional soccer player who plays for Kansas City Current of the National Women's Soccer League and for Western Sydney Wanderers in the Australian W-League.

Early life 
Hamilton grew up playing club soccer for the Colorado Storm. She attended Columbine High School from 2006 to 2010.

University of Denver Pioneers, 2010–2013
Hamilton attended the University of Denver from 2010 to 2013 where she played for the Denver Pioneers and became the school's all-time leader is points (138) and goals (51). She was one 25 NCAA players, in all divisions, to have 30+ goals and 20+ assists in their career and the only NCAA Division I athlete in history to be named player of the year in three different conferences. Hamilton finished her career ranked third at Denver in all-time assists with 36 and fifth nationally. She ranked fourth in career points and sixth in goals. Starting all 88 games in the forward position,  she averaged 0.58 goals and 0.41 assists per game, ranking No. 21 in goals and No. 5 in assists per game nationally.

In 2011, Hamilton was named Female Athlete of the year by the University of Denver and the team's Most Valuable Player. The following year in 2012, she was named NSCAA Third Team All-American and to the First Team All-West Region. She was named WAC Player of the Year and was a First Team All-WAC selection. The same year, she was twice named WAC Offensive Player of the Week for the weeks of September 10 and 24. She was also named College Sports 360's National Player of the week for Week 6.

In 2013, Hamilton was named NSCAA First Team All-American, First Team All-Great Lakes Region, and Summit League Offensive Player of the Year. She was also a MAC Hermann Trophy Semifinalist and 2013 Senior CLASS Award Finalist. She was named to the First Team All-Summit League, Summit League All-Tournament Team and was the Summit League Tournament MVP. Hamilton earned 2013 Summit League All-Academic Team honors and was named Capital One Academic All-American as well as NSCAA Scholar All-American. She was the Summit League's Player of the Week twice for the weeks of August 26 and September 16, 2013. She was named to the Top Drawer Soccer National Team of the Week on September 18, 2013.

Club career

Colorado Rapids Women, 2012–2014
Hamilton played for two seasons for the Colorado Rapids Women in the W-League under Coach Daniel Clitnovici.
In 2012 the USL W-League was the highest tier of professional women's soccer in the US and Hamilton enjoyed a great season scoring 6 times in 10 games against some of the best players in the country. Hamilton was able to lead the Colorado Rapids to a successful Inaugural season finishing 4th of 8 teams in the Western Conference, arguably the strongest conference in the USL W-League.

Western New York Flash, 2014–2016
Hamilton was selected by the Western New York Flash as the 36th overall pick of the 2014 NWSL College Draft. She was the first University of Denver graduate to be selected in a NWSL draft. She did not play the 2014 season due to an ACL injury suffered in pre-season.

Hamilton was part of the Flash team that won the 2016 NWSL Championship, she entered the game as a substitute in extra time.

North Carolina Courage, 2017–2021
Following the 2016 season, the Western New York Flash was sold and relocated to North Carolina. She appeared in 16 regular season games for the Courage, scoring 4 goals. She appeared in North Carolina's semi-final match as a first half substitute, replacing the injured Debinha. Hamilton was in the starting line-up for the NWSL Championship game, however she was subbed out in the 39th minute after sustaining an injury. The Courage went on to lose the championship game 1–0 to the Portland Thorns.

In 2018, Hamilton played in 23 regular season games for North Carolina, starting 8 games. She scored 3 goals, as North Carolina won the 2018 NWSL Shield. Hamilton appeared in the semi-final game as a second-half substitute as North Carolina defeated the Chicago Red Stars to advance to their second straight final. She was a second half sub in the Championship Game, which North Carolina won 3–0 over Portland, winning the 2018 NWSL Championship.

In 2019, Hamilton played in 22 games and scored 9 goals for North Carolina. Hamilton scored her first career hat trick, followed by a four-goal game vs Houston to tie the league record for most goals in a single game.

International career
Hamilton was called up as an overaged player to the United States U23 team on August 21, 2019. Five days later, she received her first call-up to the senior team due to a number of injuries.

On September 3, 2019, Hamilton earned her first cap with the senior national team, coming on in the second half for fellow NC Courage teammate Jessica MacDonald, in a friendly against Portugal.

Personal life
Hamilton is in relationship with defender Elizabeth Ball from the Kansas City Current.

Honors 
Individual
 2013 MAC Hermann Trophy semifinalist
 2013 Senior CLASS Award finalist
 2019 NWSL Second XI
 2019–20 Julie Dolan Medal: Best player in the 2019–20 W-League

Club
Western New York Flash
NWSL Champions: 2016

North Carolina Courage
NWSL Champions: 2018, 2019
NWSL Shield: 2017, 2018, 2019

References

External links

 
 Kristen Hamilton's University of Denver Profile

1992 births
Living people
American women's soccer players
United States women's international soccer players
Columbine High School alumni
Denver Pioneers women's soccer players
National Women's Soccer League players
North Carolina Courage players
Sportspeople from Littleton, Colorado
Soccer players from Colorado
Sportspeople from the Denver metropolitan area
Western New York Flash draft picks
Western New York Flash players
Women's association football forwards
Western Sydney Wanderers FC (A-League Women) players
A-League Women players
American expatriate sportspeople in Australia
American expatriate women's soccer players
Expatriate women's soccer players in Australia
Kansas City Current players